Glitterhouse Records is a German independent record label and mail order company based in Beverungen, North Rhine-Westphalia. It was founded in the mid-1980s. From the late 1980s until the mid-1990s it was the European branch of the American label Sub Pop. Since 1997 the annual Orange Blossom Special Festival has been staged behind the Glitterhouse headquarters. Glitterhouse created the subsidiary Glitterbeat Records label (2013) and Stag-O-Lee Mailorder record shop.

History

The beginning 
The magazine covered mainly 60s garage and psychedelia, extensions of punk, weirdo folk, and similar genres. After a vacation in Australia, Holstein imported a number of singles from Citadel Records, which were distributed through the company's mail order business. Glitterhouse's dirst own release was a cassette tape featuring German garage bands titled Battle of the Bands. In 1987 the 7"-single "Sound of The Young Soul" by The Hipsters and the compilation LP The Declaration of Fuzz were Glitterhouse's first vinyl records. By legal registration as a business in 1984, Glitterhouse Records was transformed from a simple hobby to an enterprise.

1987-1994: Distribution agreements 
In 1987 Glitterhouse started European distribution of recordings on American label Sub Pop, of Seattle, Washington. Among other bands, Sub Pop had signed Nirvana and Soundgarden; later on it was named the trigger and forerunner for the success of grunge music. This cooperation provided Glitterhouse increased popularity and a better market position. Green River, Mudhoney, The Walkabouts, Tad, Supersuckers and Seaweed, later on also the Afghan Whigs, The Spinanes, Codeine, Big Chief, Pond and many other Sub Pop groups were marketed through Glitterhouse in Europe. The cooperative transatlantic corporation with Sub Pop lasted seven years, ending in 1995 by mutual agreement.

Parallel to Sub Pop, Glitterhouse also handled European distribution for the American noise rock label Amphetamine Reptile Records, including the bands Helmet, Cows, and God Bullies. Glitterhouse ended the Amphetamine Reptile distribution arrangement when it no longer liked the artistic products.

Simultaneously, Glitterhouse signed other bands directly, including The Real Gone Lovers of Canberra, Australia, in 1988; Monster Magnet; Sylvia Juncosa, Sister Double Happiness; and Bitch Magnet.

1994 and later 
Starting in 1994, Glitterhouse shifted away from distributing other record companies' recordings. In addition to alternative rock and various American musicians, Glitterhouse signed many new bands of Scandinavian and English origin.  Since then a broad variety of musical styles has been covered by Glitterhouse Records: 
 widescreen-pop (Midnight Choir, The White Birch);
 indie-electronica (Lilium, Ai Phoenix);
 avant-garde (David Thomas & Two Pale Boys, Pere Ubu);
 dark indie folk (Wovenhand, 16 Horsepower, Chris & Carla, The Walkabouts, Dakota Suite, Savoy Grand, Willard Grant Conspiracy);
 rock (BigBang, The Great Crusades);
 indie rock (Altın Gün, Lampshade, Mount Washington, Seachange);
 modern singer-songwriters (Scott Matthew, Caroline Keating, Nive [Nielsen] & The Deer Children);
 world music acts (Tamikrest, Lobi Traoré, Ben Zabo). 
Glitterhouse Records was the first German indie label autonomously covering all inner-European and non-European export markets with exclusive deals.

Today 
Up to the present day, Glitterhouse has released about 750 records. Once a month a mail order catalogue containing approximately is released. Glitterhouse has 10 permanent employees, one apprentice and three interns. Currently  the "Glitterhouse Projects GmbH & Co KG", a limited company, comprises
 "Glitterhouse Records" 
as well as its subsidiaries/partners
 "Glitterbeat Records", specializing in "vibrant global sounds from Africa and beyond", founded in 2012 by Chris Eckman and Peter Weber., as of 2022;
 "Stag-O-Lee Mailorder" record shop, specializing in esoteric garage Rock’n’Roll, vintage rhythm and blues, etc., as of 2022;
 "Glitterhouse Mailorder", issuing a monthly mail-order catalogue with approximately 1300 titles;
 "" annual, as of 2022, outdoor music festival behind the Glitterhouse company office, starting in 1997.

Bands

See also
 List of record labels

References

External links
 
 Label history
 Official site of Orange Blossom Special Festival
 Glitterbeat Records

German independent record labels
Alternative rock record labels
IFPI members